Marko Prljević (born 2 August 1988) is a Serbian football defender who plays for Armenian club Shirak.

Career
At the beginning of August 2017, Prljević left Shirak.

In July 2018, Prljević signed with Bulgarian Second League side Tsarsko Selo.

On 2 August 2022, Ararat Yerevan confirmed that Prljević had left the club after his contract had expired, with Shirak announcing his return to their club the same day.

Honours
Donji Srem
 Serbian League Vojvodina: 2010–11

References

External links
 
 
 

1988 births
Living people
Sportspeople from Užice
Association football defenders
Serbian footballers
FK Inđija players
FK Donji Srem players
FK Rad players
FK Borac Banja Luka players
FC Shirak players
FK Proleter Novi Sad players
FC Tsarsko Selo Sofia players
Serbian SuperLiga players
Serbian First League players
Premier League of Bosnia and Herzegovina players
Armenian Premier League players
Second Professional Football League (Bulgaria) players
Serbian expatriate footballers
Serbian expatriate sportspeople in Bosnia and Herzegovina
Serbian expatriate sportspeople in Armenia
Serbian expatriate sportspeople in Bulgaria
Expatriate footballers in Bosnia and Herzegovina
Expatriate footballers in Armenia
Expatriate footballers in Bulgaria